Charles George Cave Mallam (4 August 1859 – 8 December 1950) was an English first-class cricketer and educator.

The son of Thomas Mallam, he was born in August 1859 at Iffley Manor House in Iffley, Oxfordshire. He was educated at Uppingham School, before matriculating at the University of Oxford in October 1878 as a non-collegiate student. While studying at Oxford, he made a single appearance in first-class cricket for Oxford University against the Gentlemen of England at Oxford in 1882. Batting twice in the match, he was dismissed for 2 runs in the Oxford first innings by Bunny Lucas, while in their second innings he was unbeaten on 2 runs. With his right-arm slow bowling, he bowled a total of 21 overs across both Gentlemen of England innings' without taking a wicket.

Mallam played his county cricket for Devon and Rutland, appearing for both in minor matches. Beside playing cricket, Mallam also played football for Uppingham Rovers F. C. from 1882–86. He was by profession a teacher and was the headmaster of Dunchurch Hall Preparatory School. Mallam died at Brentwood in December 1950.

References

External links

1859 births
1950 deaths
Cricketers from Oxford
People educated at Uppingham School
Alumni of the University of Oxford
English cricketers
Oxford University cricketers
English footballers
Schoolteachers from Warwickshire
Heads of schools in England
Association footballers not categorized by position